Stegastes rocasensis, commonly known as the Rocas gregory, is a damselfish of the family Pomacentridae. It is known only from the coast of Brazil including the Saint Peter and Saint Paul Archipelago.

References

rocasensis
Fish described in 1972